This is a list of forest trees of northern Thailand, organized by family. The list is from Gardner, Sidisunthorn & Anusarnsunthorn (2007).

The trees listed below can be found in the following ecoregions of Thailand:
Northern Thailand–Laos moist deciduous forests 
Central Indochina dry forests 
Kayah–Karen montane rain forests

Selected species
Some of the better known or more common species characteristic of northern Thailand are:

Dillenia indica
Magnolia champaca
Magnolia × alba
Magnolia liliifera
Cananga odorata
Crateva religiosa
Crateva adansonii
Cratoxylum cochinchinense
Cratoxylum maingayi
Mesua ferrea
Mammea siamensis
Calophyllum inophyllum
Hydnocarpus kurzii
Camellia oleifera
Schima wallichii
Anisoptera costata
Dipterocarpus costatus
Dipterocarpus turbinatus
Dipterocarpus alatus
Dipterocarpus obtusifolius
Dipterocarpus tuberculatus
Hopea odorata
Shorea roxburghii
Shorea siamensis
Shorea obtusa
Hibiscus tiliaceus
Bombax ceiba
Ceiba pentandra
Hiptage benghalensis
Murraya paniculata
Aegle marmelos
Irvingia malayana
Ochna integerrima
Melia azedarach
Chukrasia tabularis
Toona ciliata
Ziziphus mauritiana
Spondias pinnata
Dracontomelon dao
Xylia xylocarpa
Afzelia xylocarpa
Sindora siamensis
Bauhinia purpurea
Cassia fistula
Senna siamea
Senna alata
Peltophorum pterocarpum
Butea monosperma
Pterocarpus macrocarpus
Dalbergia oliveri
Millettia leucantha
Terminalia bellirica
Terminalia chebula
Terminalia catappa
Terminalia alata
Syzygium cumini
Barringtonia acutangula
Lagerstroemia speciosa
Tetrameles nudiflora
Morinda citrifolia
Pavetta indica
Vernonia arborea
Alstonia scholaris
Wrightia religiosa
Fagraea fragrans
Strychnos nux-vomica
Millingtonia hortensis
Tectona grandis
Vitex pinnata
Horsfieldia kingii
Cinnamomum camphora
Cinnamomum iners
Aquilaria crassna
Aleurites moluccana
Aporosa villosa
Baccaurea ramiflora
Phyllanthus emblica
Phyllanthus acidus
Trema orientalis
Ficus benghalensis
Ficus altissima
Ficus benjamina
Ficus hispida
Ficus racemosa
Ficus religiosa
Castanopsis acuminatissima
Quercus kerrii
Dracaena angustifolia
Phoenix loureiroi
Podocarpus neriifolius
Pinus kesiya

Dilleniales

Dilleniaceae
Dillenia
Dillenia hookeri
Dillenia parviflora
Dillenia pentagyna
Dillenia aurea
Dillenia ovata
Dillenia indica

Magnoliales

Magnoliaceae
Magnolia
Magnolia champaca
Magnolia × alba
Magnolia floribunda
Magnolia rajaniana
Magnolia baillonii
Magnolia liliifera
Magnolia henryi
Magnolia garrettii

Annonaceae

Melodorum
Melodorum fruticosum
Mitrephora
Mitrephora maingayi
Mitrephora tomentosa
Mitrephora wangii
Alphonsea
Alphonsea boniana
Orophea
Orophea brandisii
Orophea thorelii
Orophea polycarpa
Orophea sp.
Goniothalamus
Goniothalamus laoticus
Goniothalamus griffithii
Miliusa
Miliusa velutina
Miliusa lineata
Miliusa cuneata
Miliusa thorelii
Cananga
Cananga latifolia
Cananga odorata
Polyalthia
Polyalthia littoralis
Polyalthia cerasoides
Polyalthia evecta
Polyalthia suberosa
Polyalthia viridis
Polyalthia simiarum
Cyathocalyx
Cyathocalyx martabanicus

Myristicaceae
Knema
Knema erratica
Knema linifolia
Knema conferta
Knema globularia
Knema furfuracea
Knema laurina
Knema cinerea
Horsfieldia
Horsfieldia glabra
Horsfieldia kingii
Horsfieldia valida

Ranunculales

Berberidaceae
Mahonia
Mahonia nepalensis

Brassicales

Capparaceae
Crateva
Crateva magna
Crateva religiosa
Crateva adansonii

Akaniaceae
Bretschneidera
Bretschneidera sinensis

Apiales

Pittosporaceae
Pittosporum
Pittosporum napaulense
Pittosporum kerrii

Araliaceae

Schefflera
Schefflera bengalensis
Schefflera elliptica
Schefflera minimiflora
Schefflera siamensis
Schefflera pueckleri
Schefflera petelotii
Schefflera subintegra
Macropanax
Macropanax spp.
Aralia
Aralia montana
Aralia foliolosa
Aralia lanata
Aralia pectinata
Aralia fragrans
Aralia parasitica
Heteropanax
Heteropanax fragrans
Trevesia
Trevesia palmata
Trevesia lateospina
Brassaiopsis
Brassaiopsis hainla
Brassaiopsis glomerulata
Brassaiopsis ciliata
Brassaiopsis griffithii
Brassaiopsis ficifolia

Malpighiales

Malpighiaceae
Hiptage
Hiptage benghalensis

Hypericaceae
Cratoxylum
Cratoxylum formosum
Cratoxylum cochinchinense
Cratoxylum maingayi
Cratoxylum sumatranum

Clusiaceae
Garcinia
Garcinia thorelii
Garcinia mckeaniana
Garcinia speciosa
Garcinia xanthochymus
Garcinia merguensis
Garcinia cowa
Garcinia propinqua
Garcinia pedunculata

Calophyllaceae
Mesua
Mesua ferrea
Mammea
Mammea siamensis
Calophyllum
Calophyllum inophyllum
Calophyllum polyanthum

Salicaceae

Scolopia
Scolopia spinosa
Xylosma
Xylosma brachystachys
Xylosma longifolium
Homalium
Homalium ceylanicum
Homalium grandiflorum
Homalium tomentosum
Flacourtia
Flacourtia indica
Flacourtia jangomas
Flacourtia rukam
Casearia
Casearia grewiaefolia
Casearia flexuosa
Casearia flavovirens
Casearia graveolens
Salix
Salix tetrasperma
Salix babylonica

Achariaceae
Hydnocarpus
Hydnocarpus ilicifolia
Hydnocarpus kurzii
Hydnocarpus anthelminthica

Irvingiaceae
Irvingia
Irvingia malayana

Ochnaceae
Ochna
Ochna integerrima

Centroplacaceae
Bhesa
Bhesa robusta

Chrysobalanaceae
Parinari
Parinari anamensis

Rhizophoraceae
Carallia
Carallia brachiata

Euphorbiaceae

Euphorbia
Euphorbia antiquorum
Ricinus
Ricinus communis
Aleurites
Aleurites moluccana
Sumbaviopsis
Sumbaviopsis albicans
Cleidion
Cleidion spiciflorum
Croton
Croton argyratus
Croton tiglium
Croton hutchinsonianus
Croton kerrii
Croton poilanei
Croton roxburghii
Croton robustus
Croton cascarilloides
Croton kongensis
Homonoia
Homonoia riparia
Macaranga
Macaranga denticulata
Macaranga siamensis
Macaranga kurzii
Mallotus
Mallotus khasianus
Mallotus cuneatus
Mallotus barbatus
Mallotus oblongifolius
Mallotus paniculatus
Mallotus peltatus
Mallotus philippensis
Suregada
Suregada multiflora
Balakata
Balakata baccata
Triadica
Triadica cochinchinensis
Falconeria
Falconeria insignis
Trigonostemon
Trigonostemon thyrsoideus
Trigonostemon albiflorus
Trewia
Trewia nudiflora

Phyllanthaceae

Cleistanthus
Cleistanthus hirsutulus
Cleistanthus tomentosus
Antidesma
Antidesma bunius
Antidesma ghaesembilla
Antidesma sootepense
Antidesma acidum
Antidesma montanum
Antidesma velutinosum
Aporosa
Aporosa villosa
Aporosa dioica
Aporosa wallichii
Baccaurea
Baccaurea ramiflora
Bischofia
Bischofia javanica
Bridelia
Bridelia curtisii
Bridelia affinis
Bridelia retusa
Bridelia stipularis
Bridelia tomentosa
Bridelia glauca
Bridelia ovata
Glochidion
Glochidion dasystylum
Glochidion assamicum
Glochidion acuminatum
Glochidion rubrum
Glochidion eriocarpum
Glochidion sphaerogynum
Ostodes
Ostodes paniculata
Phyllanthus
Phyllanthus emblica
Phyllanthus columnaris
Phyllanthus roseus
Phyllanthus acidus

Ericales

Ericaceae

Vaccinium
Vaccinium sprengelii
Vaccinium apricum
Craibiodendron
Craibiodendron stellatum
Lyonia
Lyonia ovalifolia
Rhododendron
Rhododendron microphyton
Rhododendron ludwigianum
Rhododendron veitchianum
Rhododendron moulmainense
Rhododendron arboreum
Rhododendron surasianum
Rhododendron simsii
Rhododendron lyi

Theaceae

Camellia
Camellia taliensis
Camellia connata
Camellia tenii
Camellia sinensis
Camellia oleifera
Schima
Schima wallichii
Gordonia
Gordonia dalglieshiana
Pyrenaria
Pyrenaria garrettiana
Pyrenaria cameliaefolia

Pentaphylacaceae
Ternstroemia
Ternstroemia gymnanthera
Ternstroemia bancana
Adinandra
Adinandra integerrima
Adinandra laotica
Adinandra oblonga
Anneslea
Anneslea fragrans
Eurya
Eurya acuminata
Eurya nitida

Actinidiaceae
Saurauia
Saurauia roxburghii
Saurauia napaulensis

Lecythidaceae
Careya
Careya arborea
Barringtonia
Barringtonia acutangula
Barringtonia augusta

Lythraceae
Lagerstroemia
Lagerstroemia indica
Lagerstroemia loudonii
Lagerstroemia villosa
Lagerstroemia calyculata
Lagerstroemia tomentosa
Lagerstroemia floribunda
Lagerstroemia cochinchinensis
Lagerstroemia balansae
Lagerstroemia venusta
Lagerstroemia macrocarpa
Lagerstroemia speciosa
Duabanga
Duabanga grandiflora

Primulaceae

Ardisia
Ardisia corymbifera
Ardisia crenata
Ardisia attenuata
Ardisia kerrii
Ardisia quinquegona
Ardisia polycephala
Ardisia colorata
Ardisia nervosa
Ardisia virens
Rapanea
Rapanea yunnanensis
Maesa
Maesa perlarius
Maesa ramentacea
Maesa paniculata
Maesa permollis
Maesa glomerata
Maesa montana
Maesa indica

Sapotaceae

Payena
Payena lanceolata
Payena lucida
Pouteria
Pouteria grandifolia
Palaquium
Palaquium obovatum
Palaquium garrettii
Xantolis
Xantolis tomentosa
Xantolis cambodiana
Xantolis burmanica
Sarcosperma
Sarcosperma arboreum
Sarcosperma kachinense

Ebenaceae
Diospyros
Diospyros ferrea
Diospyros variegata
Diospyros pilosanthera
Diospyros dictyoneura
Diospyros frutescens
Diospyros malabarica
Diospyros rhodocalyx
Diospyros glandulosa
Diospyros ehretioides
Diospyros mollis
Diospyros dumetorum
Diospyros montana
Diospyros undulata
Diospyros martabanica
Diospyros coaetanea
Diospyros dasyphylla

Symplocaceae
Symplocos
Symplocos lucida
Symplocos longifolia
Symplocos sumuntia
Symplocos dryophila
Symplocos hookeri
Symplocos racemosa
Symplocos macrophylla
Symplocos henschelii
Symplocos cochinchinensis

Styracaceae
Styrax
Styrax benzoides
Styrax rugosum
Styrax benzoin

Malvales

Dipterocarpaceae

Anisoptera
Anisoptera costata
Anisoptera scaphula
Vatica
Vatica harmandiana
Vatica odorata
Parashorea
Parashorea stellata
Dipterocarpus
Dipterocarpus costatus
Dipterocarpus turbinatus
Dipterocarpus alatus
Dipterocarpus obtusifolius
Dipterocarpus tuberculatus
Dipterocarpus retusus
Hopea
Hopea odorata
Shorea
Shorea roxburghii
Shorea farinosa
Shorea siamensis
Shorea obtusa
Shorea guiso
Shorea thorelii

Malvaceae

Malvoideae
Kydia
Kydia calycina
Hibiscus
Hibiscus macrophyllus
Hibiscus tiliaceus
Hibiscus glanduliferus
Hibiscus mutabilis

Bombacoideae
Bombax
Bombax ceiba
Bombax anceps
Bombax insigne
Ceiba
Ceiba pentandra
Pachira
Pachira aquatica

Byttnerioideae
Abroma
Abroma augusta
Melochia
Melochia umbellata

Helicteroideae
Helicteres
Helicteres angustifolia
Helicteres elongata
Helicteres hirsuta
Helicteres isora
Helicteres lanata
Helicteres lanceolata
Helicteres viscida
Reevesia
Reevesia pubescens

Sterculioideae

Pterygota
Pterygota alata
Sterculia
Sterculia pexa
Sterculia foetida
Sterculia urens
Sterculia villosa
Sterculia hypochroa
Sterculia balanghas
Sterculia guttata
Sterculia lanceolata
Firmiana
Firmiana colorata
Firmiana kerrii
Pterocymbium
Pterocymbium macranthum
Pterocymbium tinctorium

Dombeyoideae

Pterospermum
Pterospermum cinnamomeum
Pterospermum lanceifolium
Pterospermum littorale
Pterospermum acerifolium
Pterospermum grande
Pterospermum grandiflorum
Pterospermum diversifolium
Pterospermum semisagittatum
Eriolaena
Eriolaena candollei
Schoutenia
Schoutenia glomerata
Schoutenia ovata

Brownlowioideae
Pentace
Pentace burmanica
Brownlowia
Brownlowia peltata
Berrya
Berrya mollis
Berrya cordifolia

Grewioideae

Colona
Colona winitii
Colona elobata
Colona auriculata
Colona floribunda
Colona flagrocarpa
Grewia
Grewia eriocarpa
Grewia winitii
Grewia sessilifolia
Grewia abutilifolia
Grewia lacei
Grewia laevigata
Grewia hirsuta
Microcos
Microcos paniculata
Microcos tomentosa

Muntingiaceae
Muntingia
Muntingia calabura

Thymelaeaceae
Aquilaria
Aquilaria crassna

Oxalidales

Elaeocarpaceae
Elaeocarpus
Elaeocarpus floribundus
Elaeocarpus hainanensis
Elaeocarpus rugosus
Elaeocarpus petiolatus
Elaeocarpus stipularis
Elaeocarpus braceanus
Elaeocarpus robustus
Elaeocarpus sphaericus
Elaeocarpus hygrophilus
Elaeocarpus lanceifolius
Elaeocarpus prunifolius
Sloanea
Sloanea tomentosa
Sloanea sigun

Sapindales

Rutaceae

Glycosmis
Glycosmis esquirolii
Glycosmis ovoidea
Glycosmis puberula
Glycosmis cochinchinensis
Acronychia
Acronychia pedunculata
Atalantia
Atalantia roxburghiana
Atalantia monophylla
Murraya
Murraya paniculata
Murraya koenigii
Aegle
Aegle marmelos
Feronia
Feronia limonia
Euodia
Euodia meliaefolia
Euodia triphylla
Euodia viticina
Euodia glomerata
Micromelum
Micromelum minutum
Micromelum falcatum
Micromelum hirsutum
Clausena
Clausena excavata
Zanthoxylum
Zanthoxylum rhetsa
Zanthoxylum acanthopodium
Zanthoxylum nitidum
Zanthoxylum evodiaefolium
Zanthoxylum myriacanthum
Harrisonia
Harrisonia perforata

Simaroubaceae
Ailanthus
Ailanthus triphysa
Picrasma
Picrasma javanica
Eurycoma
Eurycoma longifolia
Brucea
Brucea mollis
Brucea javanica

Burseraceae
Protium
Protium serratum
Garuga
Garuga pinnata
Garuga floribunda
Garuga pierrei
Canarium
Canarium subulatum
Canarium strictum
Canarium euphyllum

Meliaceae

Walsura
Walsura robusta
Walsura intermedia
Walsura trichostemon
Cipadessa
Cipadessa baccifera
Melia
Melia toosendan
Melia dubia
Melia azedarach
Melia indica
Dysoxylum
Dysoxylum cochinchinense
Dysoxylum excelsum
Dysoxylum andamanicum
Chisocheton
Chisocheton siamensis
Sandoricum
Sandoricum koetjape
Aglaia
Aglaia lawii
Aglaia chittagonga
Aglaia grandis
Aphanamixis
Aphanamixis polystachya
Chukrasia
Chukrasia tabularis
Chukrasia velutina
Toona
Toona ciliata
Toona microcarpa
Toona sureni
Trichilia
Trichilia connaroides

Sapindaceae

Allophylus
Allophylus cobbe
Nephelium
Nephelium hypoleucum
Nephelium lappaceum
Sisyrolepis
Sisyrolepis muricata
Xerospermum
Xerospermum noronhianum
Arytera
Arytera littoralis
Pometia
Pometia pinnata
Harpullia
Harpullia arborea
Harpullia cupanioides
Schleichera
Schleichera oleosa
Dimocarpus
Dimocarpus longan
Litchi
Litchi chinensis
Lepisanthes
Lepisanthes rubiginosa
Lepisanthes tetraphylla
Arfeuillea
Arfeuillea arborescens
Sapindus
Sapindus rarak
Mischocarpus
Mischocarpus pentapetalus
Aesculus
Aesculus assamica
Acer
Acer laurinum
Acer oblongum
Acer chiangdaoense
Acer thomsonii
Acer wilsonii
Acer calcaratum

Anacardiaceae

Bouea
Bouea oppositifolia
Bouea racemosus
Holigarna
Holigarna kurzii
Mangifera
Mangifera sylvatica
Mangifera caloneura
Mangifera odorata
Mangifera indica
Buchanania
Buchanania cochinchinensis
Buchanania glabra
Buchanania reticulata
Buchanania arborescens
Gluta
Gluta obovata
Gluta usitata
Semecarpus
Semecarpus cochinchinensis
Rhus
Rhus chinensis
Rhus succedanea
Rhus rhetsoides
Choerospondias
Choerospondias axillaris
Spondias
Spondias pinnata
Spondias lakonensis
Lannea
Lannea coromandelica
Dracontomelon
Dracontomelon dao

Santalales

Schoepfiaceae
Schoepfia
Schoepfia fragrans

Olacaceae
Anacolosa
Anacolosa ilicoides

Aquifoliales

Aquifoliaceae
Ilex
Ilex umbellulata
Ilex godajam
Ilex englishii

Cardiopteridaceae
Gonocaryum
Gonocaryum lobbianum

Stemonuraceae
Gomphandra
Gomphandra tetrandra

Metteniusales

Metteniusaceae
Apodytes
Apodytes dimidiata

Icacinales

Icacinaceae
Nothapodytes
Nothapodytes foetida
Pittosporopsis
Pittosporopsis kerrii
Platea
Platea latifolia

Celastrales

Celastraceae

Microtropis
Microtropis pallens
Maytenus
Maytenus stylosa
Maytenus marcanii
Euonymus
Euonymus similis
Euonymus colonoides
Euonymus mitratus
Glyptopetalum
Glyptopetalum sclerocarpum
Lophopetalum
Lophopetalum wallichii
Siphonodon
Siphonodon celastrineus

Rosales

Rhamnaceae
Ziziphus
Ziziphus rugosa
Ziziphus incurva
Ziziphus nummularia
Ziziphus mauritiana

Rosaceae
Prunus
Prunus cerasoides
Prunus persica
Prunus arborea
Prunus phaeosticta
Prunus javanica
Prunus wallichii
Prunus ceylanica
Eriobotrya
Eriobotrya bengalensis
Eriobotrya japonica

Moraceae

Morus
Morus macroura
Morus alba
Morus australis
Broussonetia
Broussonetia papyrifera
Streblus
Streblus asper
Streblus ilicifolius
Streblus taxoides
Streblus indicus
Artocarpus
Artocarpus lakoocha
Artocarpus gomezianus
Artocarpus chaplasha
Artocarpus lanceolata
Maclura
Maclura fruticosa
Ficus
Ficus elastica
Ficus benghalensis
Ficus altissima
Ficus annulata
Ficus auriculata
Ficus benjamina
Ficus callosa
Ficus capillipes
Ficus curtipes
Ficus fistulosa
Ficus fulva
Ficus geniculata
Ficus glaberrima
Ficus heteropleura
Ficus heterophylla
Ficus hirta
Ficus hispida
Ficus lacor
Ficus microcarpa
Ficus nervosa
Ficus pisocarpa
Ficus racemosa
Ficus religiosa
Ficus rumphii
Ficus semicordata
Ficus superba
Ficus variegata
Ficus virens

Urticaceae

Maoutia
Maoutia puya
Dendrocnide
Dendrocnide sinuata
Dendrocnide stimulans
Boehmeria
Boehmeria clidemioides
Boehmeria chiangmaiensis
Boehmeria macrophylla
Boehmeria malabarica
Boehmeria thailandica
Boehmeria zollingeriana
Debregeasia
Debregeasia longifolia
Debregeasia squamata
Debregeasia wallichiana

Cannabaceae
Trema
Trema orientalis
Celtis
Celtis tetrandra
Celtis timorensis

Ulmaceae
Holoptelea
Holoptelea integrifolia
Ulmus
Ulmus lancifolia

Crossosomatales

Staphyleaceae
Turpinia
Turpinia pomifera
Turpinia nepalensis

Fabales

Polygalaceae
Xanthophyllum
Xanthophyllum virens
Xanthophyllum flavescens

Fabaceae
Ormosia
Ormosia sumatrana

Mimosoideae

Mimosa
Mimosa spp.
Acacia
Acacia harmandiana
Adenanthera
Adenanthera microsperma
Adenanthera pavonina
Albizia
Albizia lucidior
Albizia lebbeck
Albizia crassiramea
Albizia procera
Albizia odoratissima
Albizia garrettii
Albizia lebbekoides
Albizia chinensis
Archidendron
Archidendron clypearia
Archidendron lucidum
Archidendron jiringa
Archidendron glomeriflorum
Xylia
Xylia xylocarpa
Parkia
Parkia leiophylla
Parkia sumatrana
Parkia timoriana
Parkia fraxinifolius
Pithecellobium
Pithecellobium tenue

Caesalpinioideae

Caesalpinia
Caesalpinia sappan
Senna
Senna siamea
Senna timoriensis
Senna surattensis
Senna sulfurea
Senna spectabilis
Senna alata
Cassia
Cassia fistula
Cassia garrettiana
Cassia bakeriana
Cassia grandis
Cassia agnes
Cassia javanica
Peltophorum
Peltophorum dasyrrhachis
Peltophorum pterocarpum

Detarioideae
Afzelia
Afzelia xylocarpa
Sindora
Sindora siamensis

Cercidoideae
Bauhinia
Bauhinia variegata
Bauhinia purpurea
Bauhinia racemosa
Bauhinia malabarica
Bauhinia brachycarpa
Bauhinia saccocalyx

Phaseoleae
Butea
Butea monosperma
Butea superba
Erythrina
Erythrina stricta
Erythrina subumbrans
Erythrina suberosa

Faboideae

Pterocarpus
Pterocarpus macrocarpus
Pterocarpus indicus
Dalbergia
Dalbergia nigrescens
Dalbergia lanceolaria
Dalbergia rimosa
Dalbergia ovata
Dalbergia oliveri
Dalbergia cana
Dalbergia cultrata
Dalbergia assamica
Dalbergia sericea
Dalbergia stipulacea
Callerya
Callerya atropurpurea
Millettia
Millettia macrostachya
Millettia leucantha
Millettia pubinervis
Millettia brandisiana
Derris
Derris robusta

Myrtales

Combretaceae

Terminalia
Terminalia bellirica
Terminalia chebula
Terminalia catappa
Terminalia mucronata
Terminalia glaucifolia
Terminalia calamansanai
Terminalia myriocarpa
Terminalia alata
Terminalia cambodiana
Terminalia triptera
Terminalia franchetii
Combretum
Combretum quadrangulare
Combretum apetalum
Combretum winitii
Combretum deciduum
Combretum trifoliatum
Combretum decandrum
Combretum acuminatum

Myrtaceae

Eugenia
Eugenia bracteata
Syzygium
Syzygium zeylanicum
Syzygium gratum
Syzygium cerasiforme
Syzygium helferi
Syzygium thumra
Syzygium grande
Syzygium glaucum
Syzygium globiflorum
Syzygium angkae
Syzygium polyanthum
Syzygium winitii
Syzygium balsameum
Syzygium ripicola
Syzygium megacarpum
Syzygium formosum
Syzygium siamense
Syzygium diospyrifolium
Syzygium jambos
Syzygium cumini
Syzygium fruticosum
Syzygium albiflorum
Syzygium zimmermannii
Syzygium claviflorum
Syzygium cinereum
Cleistocalyx
Cleistocalyx operculatus
Cleistocalyx nervosum
Decaspermum
Decaspermum parviflorum
Tristaniopsis
Tristaniopsis burmanica

Melastomataceae
Memecylon
Memecylon plebejum
Memecylon scutellatum

Crypteroniaceae
Crypteronia
Crypteronia paniculata

Cucurbitales

Tetramelaceae
Tetrameles
Tetrameles nudiflora

Cornales

Cornaceae
Alangium
Alangium salviifolium
Alangium barbatum
Alangium kurzii
Alangium chinense

Nyssaceae
Nyssa
Nyssa javanica
Mastixia
Mastixia euonymoides

Dipsacales

Adoxaceae
Viburnum
Viburnum inopinatum
Viburnum cylindricum
Viburnum foetidum
Sambucus
Sambucus javanica
Sambucus simpsonii

Gentianales

Rubiaceae

Meyna
Meyna spp.
Mycetia
Mycetia chasalioides
Mycetia rivicola
Mycetia longifolia
Hyptianthera
Hyptianthera bracteata
Hyptianthera stricta
Lasianthus
Lasianthus hookeri
Lasianthus kurzii
Hymenodictyon
Hymenodictyon orixense
Hymenodictyon excelsum
Psychotria
Psychotria monticola
Psychotria ophioxyloides
Haldina
Haldina cordifolia
Breonia (syn. Anthocephalus)
Breonia chinensis (syn. Anthocephalus chinensis)
Nauclea
Nauclea orientalis
Mitragyna
Mitragyna rotundifolia
Mitragyna hirsuta
Mitragyna diversifolia
Mitragyna parvifolia
Mitragyna trichotoma
Schizomussaenda
Schizomussaenda dehiscens
Morinda
Morinda tomentosa
Morinda citrifolia
Canthium
Canthium glabrum
Canthium umbellatum
Canthium parvifolium
Vangueria
Vangueria pubescens
Vangueria spinosa
Catunaregam
Catunaregam spathulifolia
Catunaregam spinosa
Catunaregam longispina
Catunaregam tomentosa
Fagerlindia
Fagerlindia plumbea
Wendlandia
Wendlandia tinctoria
Wendlandia scabra
Pavetta
Pavetta indica
Ixora
Ixora kerrii
Tarennoidea
Tarennoidea wallichii
Tarenna
Tarenna vanprukii
Gardenia
Gardenia sootepensis
Gardenia obtusifolia
Ceriscoides
Ceriscoides sessilifolia
Ceriscoides turgida
Rothmannia
Rothmannia sootepensis

Apocynaceae

Rauvolfia
Rauvolfia verticillata
Carissa
Carissa spinarum
Hunteria
Hunteria zeylanica
Tabernaemontana
Tabernaemontana corymbosa
Tabernaemontana bovina
Tabernaemontana divaricata
Tabernaemontana peduncularis
Tabernaemontana bufalina
Kibatalia
Kibatalia macrophylla
Kopsia
Kopsia arborea
Alstonia
Alstonia scholaris
Alstonia rostrata
Alstonia rupestris
Alstonia macrophylla
Holarrhena
Holarrhena pubescens
Holarrhena curtisii
Wrightia
Wrightia arborea
Wrightia religiosa
Wrightia coccinea
Wrightia pubescens

Gentianaceae
Fagraea
Fagraea ceilanica
Fagraea fragrans

Loganiaceae
Strychnos
Strychnos nux-blanda
Strychnos nux-vomica

Asterales

Asteraceae
Gochnatia
Gochnatia decora
Vernonia
Vernonia volkameriifolia
Vernonia parishii
Vernonia arborea

Lamiales

Oleaceae

Fraxinus
Fraxinus floribunda
Schrebera
Schrebera swietenioides
Chionanthus
Chionanthus ramiflorus
Chionanthus caudifolius = Linociera caudata
Chionanthus sutepensis = Linociera sutepensis
Ligustrum
Ligustrum confusum
Olea
Olea rosea
Olea oblanceolata
Olea salicifolia
Olea dioica

Scrophulariaceae
Buddleja
Buddleja asiatica

Paulowniaceae
Wightia
Wightia speciosissima

Bignoniaceae

Santisukia
Santisukia kerrii
Pauldopia
Pauldopia ghorta
Markhamia
Markhamia stipulata
Fernandoa
Fernandoa adenophylla
Fernandoa collignonii
Dolichandrone
Dolichandrone serrulata
Dolichandrone columnaris
Radermachera
Radermachera eberhardtii
Radermachera ignea
Stereospermum
Stereospermum fimbriatum
Stereospermum cylindricum
Stereospermum colais
Stereospermum neuranthum
Oroxylum
Oroxylum indicum
Millingtonia
Millingtonia hortensis
Heterophragma
Heterophragma sulfureum

Lamiaceae

Clerodendrum
Clerodendrum colebrookianum
Clerodendrum disparifolium
Clerodendrum fragrans
Clerodendrum garrettianum
Clerodendrum infortunatum
Clerodendrum paniculatum
Clerodendrum villosum
Gmelina
Gmelina arborea
Tectona
Tectona grandis
Callicarpa
Callicarpa arborea
Callicarpa rubella
Premna
Premna latifolia
Premna villosa
Premna pyramidata
Vitex
Vitex trifolia
Vitex limonifolia
Vitex pinnata
Vitex peduncularis
Vitex glabrata
Vitex vestita
Vitex canescens
Vitex quinata

Boraginales

Boraginaceae
Ehretia
Ehretia acuminata
Ehretia laevis

Solanales

Solanaceae
Solanum
Solanum verbascifolium

Laurales

Lauraceae

Machilus
Machilus cochinchinensis
Actinodaphne
Actinodaphne henryi
Actinodaphne montana
Litsea
Litsea wightiana
Litsea semecarpifolia
Litsea firma
Litsea albicans
Litsea cubeba
Litsea salicifolia
Litsea glutinosa
Litsea monopetala
Neolitsea
Neolitsea cassia
Lindera
Lindera caudata
Cinnamomum
Cinnamomum porrectum
Cinnamomum camphora
Cinnamomum iners
Cinnamomum caudatum
Cinnamomum verum
Phoebe
Phoebe lanceolata
Phoebe paniculata
Phoebe cathia
Persea
Persea gamblei
Nothaphoebe
Nothaphoebe umbelliflora
Alseodaphne
Alseodaphne spp.
Cryptocarya
Cryptocarya pallens
Potameia
Potameia spp.
Beilschmiedia
Beilschmiedia spp.

Proteales

Proteaceae
Helicia
Helicia nilagirica
Helicia formosana
Helicia terminalis

Sabiaceae
Meliosma
Meliosma simplicifolia
Meliosma pinnata

Fagales

Juglandaceae
Engelhardtia
Engelhardtia spicata
Engelhardtia serrata

Betulaceae
Betula
Betula alnoides
Carpinus
Carpinus londoniana
Carpinus poilanei

Myricaceae
Myrica
Myrica esculenta

Fagaceae

Castanopsis
Castanopsis acuminatissima
Castanopsis argyrophylla
Castanopsis armata
Castanopsis calathiformis
Castanopsis diversifolia
Castanopsis indica
Castanopsis tribuloides
Lithocarpus
Lithocarpus dealbatus
Lithocarpus aggregatus
Lithocarpus craibianus
Lithocarpus elegans
Lithocarpus fenestratus
Lithocarpus garrettianus
Lithocarpus echinops
Lithocarpus lindleyanus
Lithocarpus polystachyus
Lithocarpus sootepensis
Lithocarpus truncatus
Lithocarpus thomsonii
Quercus
Quercus incana
Quercus aliena
Quercus brandisiana
Quercus eumorpha
Quercus kerrii
Quercus kingiana
Quercus lanata
Quercus lenticellata
Quercus lineata
Quercus mespilifolioides
Quercus semiserrata
Quercus vestita

Asparagales

Asparagaceae
Dracaena
Dracaena loureiri
Dracaena angustifolia

Pandanales

Pandanaceae
Pandanus
Pandanus spp.

Arecales

Arecaceae

Livistona
Livistona speciosa
Livistona jenkinsiana
Livistona chinensis
Trachycarpus
Trachycarpus oreophilus
Corypha
Corypha umbraculifera
Corypha utan
Borassus
Borassus flabellifer
Caryota
Caryota gigas
Caryota urens
Caryota mitis
Wallichia
Wallichia siamensis
Pinanga
Pinanga sylvestris
Areca
Areca triandra
Areca laosensis
Areca catechu
Arenga
Arenga westerhoutii
Arenga pinnata
Phoenix
Phoenix loureiri

Pinales

Cupressaceae
Calocedrus
Calocedrus macrolepis

Taxaceae
Cephalotaxus
Cephalotaxus griffithii

Podocarpaceae
Podocarpus
Podocarpus neriifolius
Dacrycarpus
Dacrycarpus imbricatus
Nageia
Nageia wallichiana
Dacrydium
Dacrydium elatum

Pinaceae
Pinus
Pinus kesiya
Pinus merkusii

Cycadales

Cycadaceae
Cycas
Cycas pectinata
Cycas siamensis
Cycas simplicipinna

Cyatheales

Cyatheaceae
Cyathea
Cyathea gigantea
Cyathea chinensis
Cyathea spinulosa
Cyathea podophylla
Cyathea latebrosa

See also
List of plants of Doi Suthep–Pui National Park
List of Thai provincial trees

References

Trees
Thailand